The Parliament of Grenada is composed of the monarch and two chambers: Senate and the House of Representatives. It operates from the New Parliament Building in St. George's.

Structure
Parliament consists of the King, represented by the Governor General, the Senate and the House of Representatives.  The Governor-General summons Parliament, brings its session to an end by prorogation, and formally assents to every bill before it can become law.  In practice, she exercises all these powers on the advice of the Prime Minister and the Cabinet.

The passage of legislation depends on the participation of all three component parts of Parliament.  A bill must be agreed to by both Houses and receive the Royal Assent before it can become an Act of Parliament.  The powers of the Senate and the House of Representatives are constitutionally equal except that financial legislation may not be introduced in the Senate.

All Senators are appointed by the Governor General on the advice of the Prime Minister of Grenada and the Leader of the Opposition.

The House of Representatives is directly elected by the people, and although by tradition the Senate is the Upper House and the House of Representatives is the Lower House, it is the House of Representatives which plays the predominant part in the parliamentary system.

The Parliament of Grenada came into being in 1974 when Grenada became an independent country.

Functions of the Senate
 To act as a house of review with responsibility for expressing second opinion in relation to legislative and other proposals initiated in the House of Representatives;
 To ensure proper consideration of all legislation;
 To provide adequate scrutiny of financial measures;
 To initiate non-financial legislation as the Senate sees fit: the Senate’s capacity to initiate proposed legislation effectively means that Parliament is not confined in its opportunities for considering public issues in a legislative context to those matters covered by bills brought forward by the executive;
 To probe and check the administration of laws and to keep itself informed, and to insist on ministerial accountability for the administration of the Government;
 To provide effective scrutiny of Government and enable adequate expression of debate about policy and government programs. As a parliamentary forum, the Senate is one place where a Government can be, of right, questioned and obliged to answer.

All bills must be passed by the Senate before they can become law, and it has the constitutional right to reject any bill, and keep on rejecting it as long as it sees fit.  It can also amend any bill, although it cannot initiate or increase the amount of any bill dealing with taxation or expenditure.

Governor-General
The Governor General personifies the State. In law, she is the head of the Executive and an integral part of the legislature. In practice, she exercises all these powers on the advice of the Prime Minister and the Cabinet.

House of Representatives
The House of Representatives has 16 members: 15 elected for a five-year term in single-seat constituencies, and a speaker. The elections are by the first-past-the-post system. The National Democratic Congress currently holds a majority with 9 seats, while the opposition New National Party holds 6 seat in the House of Representatives.
The House of Representatives is the focal point of parliamentary activity and public attention, the grand forum of the nation, where major national and international issues are debated; where the Prime Minister and the Leader of the Opposition may be seen in regular confrontation; where Cabinet Ministers defend the policies and conduct of their departments; where the nation’s business in freely and openly transacted, all that is said and done being faithfully recorded.

Parliament makes the laws and the House of Representatives plays the predominant part in making them.  Any member can introduce bills, except bills involving expenditure or taxation, which can only be introduced by the government.  Since the responsibilities of government now extend into almost every sphere of activity, and since most government action involves spending money (and raising it by taxes, fees, loans, and so forth), most of the time of the House is spent on Government Bills.

Every bill must pass both Houses and receive the Royal Assent before it becomes law.  Assent is signified by the Governor General.

By law a general election must be held at least once every five years.  However, Parliament may be dissolved and an election called before the statutory period has elapsed, and this is what normally happens.  The power to dissolve Parliament is a royal prerogative exercised by the Governor General, normally on the advice of the Prime Minister.

The House of Representatives was modeled on the British, and even now, in any matter of procedure not provided for by its own rules and practices, the rules and practices of the British House of Commons are followed.

Senate
The Senate has 13 appointed members. Ten are appointed on the advice of the Prime Minister, with three of them being appointed "after he has consulted the organizations or interests which he considers the Senators should be selected to represent," and three are appointed on advice of the Leader of the Opposition. The National Democratic Congress has 7 seats in the senate, while the New National Party has 3. The remaining 3 seats are held by independents representing the labour movement, farmers and fishers, and the business community.

See also
Politics of Grenada
List of legislatures by country
List of speakers of the House of Representatives of Grenada
List of presidents of the Senate of Grenada
Leader of the Opposition (Grenada)

References

Grenada
Politics of Grenada
Government of Grenada
Grenada
Grenada